Malapascua is a Philippine island situated in the Visayan Sea,  across a shallow strait from the northernmost tip of Cebu Island. Administratively, it is part of the peninsular barangay of Logon, Daanbantayan, Cebu. According to the latest 2020 census, the island has an estimated population of 6,257.

Holiday industry 

Malapascua became known in the early 1990s as a dive destination. Prior to this, the island was known for its wide white sand beach, known as Bounty Beach; it has also become known for its beautiful coral gardens, coral walls and excellent local dive spots, as well as further-out sites including Gato Island, Monad Shoal, and Kemod Shoal. Monad Shoal is an underwater plateau where thresher sharks and manta rays can regularly be sighted. Most of the islanders derive their livelihood from tourism, while some still rely on subsistence fishing and farming.

Malapascua Island or barangay Logon is believed to be the place where the Virgin de los Desamparados made a miracle sometime in 1890 when the island had only nine households of the Monteclar, Deogrades, Rosales, Gulfan, Rubio, Bohol and Bruces families. It was said to be a piece of wood that had never burnt. In 1907 the parish priest of Kandaya, now Daanbantayan town, Rev. Fr.  Maga, baptized it of its name upon the request of the local residents. The size of the image is not the original size and it is said to be growing until present. Devotees from different parts of the country and even abroad come during the feast days on May 11 and 12. The chapel was originally made of coconut palm and leaves but now it is made of steel and cement.

Similar to other islands, natives were dependent on fishing as a source of livelihood. Agricultural products such as corn and rice were supplied from neighboring islands, such as Cebu and Leyte. With the population increasing and fish stocks dwindling, tourism came to the rescue. Nowadays, the majority of islanders either directly or indirectly make a living out of tourism, which is developing rapidly. The growth of tourism has also increased local immigration to the island, thus the demand for housing. The lack of a pier for bigger boats – due to financial constraints – is keeping a brake on construction growth.

Monad Shoal

The site is best known as the only place in the world where thresher sharks can be seen regularly at and just before sunrise. They use the seamount as a cleaning station for bluestreak and moon cleaner wrasse to remove ectoparasites such as gnathiids from their skin and clean their gills and mouths. The shoal also attracts other pelagic fish such as devil rays and eagle rays. Manta rays and hammerheads are seasonal. Unfortunately most of the coral reefs of the shoal have been damaged by destructive fishing methods, as has happened all over the Philippines, and elsewhere. In June 2016 a ship ran aground on the shoal, damaging  of the protected area.

See also
Carnaza Island – an island north of Malapascua

References

Sources

External links

 Official Municipality of Daanbantayan website
 Malapascua Island website

Beaches of the Philippines
Underwater diving sites in the Philippines
Islands of Cebu
Tourist attractions in Cebu